Ralph Egerton Clilverd MC (30 July 1887 – 7 June 1970) was a British modern pentathlete. He competed at the 1912 Summer Olympics at the age of 24, where he placed 1st in swimming with a time of 4:58.4 and 11th overall.

He was awarded an MC in 1917 serving in the Royal Field Artillery.

References

External links
 

1887 births
1970 deaths
Athletes from London
British Army personnel of World War I
British male modern pentathletes
Olympic modern pentathletes of Great Britain
Modern pentathletes at the 1912 Summer Olympics
People from Brixton
Recipients of the Military Cross
Royal Field Artillery officers